Patrushev is a Russian masculine surname, its feminine counterpart is Patrusheva. It may refer to
Dmitry Patrushev (born 1977), Russian banker and politician
Nikolai Patrushev (born 1951), Russian political and security figure
Pyotr Patrushev (1942-2016), Russian author

Russian-language surnames